The 1887 Kilkenny Senior Hurling Championship was the inaugural staging of the Kilkenny Senior Hurling Championship since its establishment by the Kilkenny County Board. The championship began on 3 April 1887 and ended on 17 April 1887.

On 17 April 1887, Tullaroan won the championship after a 1-01 to 0-04 defeat of Mooncoin in the final. It was the first of 20 championship titles for the Tullaroan club.

Championship details

Overview

All of the existing clubs within County Kilkenny were invited to participate in the championship, however, at the time hurling had a limited appeal and was confined to small pockets around the county. Just four teams participated: Castlecomer, the Kilkenny Working Men's Club, Mooncoin and Tullaroan.

Results

Semi-finals

Final

References

Kilkenny Senior Hurling Championship
Kilkenny Senior Hurling Championship